Cassa di Risparmio di Fabriano e Cupramontana S.p.A. known as Carifac, is a former Italian regional retail bank, before owned by Veneto Banca and now by Intesa Sanpaolo.

History
The bank was owned by a philanthropic organization: Fondazione Cassa di Risparmio di Fabriano e Cupramontana (Fondazione Carifac) but acquired by and absorbed into Veneto Banca in the 2010s. Cattolica Assicurazioni was a minority owner for 17.33% in 2005.

Sponsorship
Carifac was a sponsor of Fabriano Basket.

Bank Foundation
Fondazione Cassa di Risparmio di Fabriano e Cupramontana or Fondazione Carifac held 561,603 shares of Veneto Banca as of 31 December 2014.

References

External links
 Official Site 
 Fondazione Carifac 

Defunct banks of Italy
Banks disestablished in 2013
Italian companies disestablished in 2013
Companies based in le Marche
Province of Ancona
Fabriano